Aleksandar “Saša” Viciknez (Serbian Cyrillic: Александар Саша Вицикнез; born 30 May 1974) is a retired Serbian footballer who played mostly as a left winger.

Viciknez debuted in the Second League of FR Yugoslavia in 1995 with FK Dinamo Pančevo, and ultimately reached the highest tier in 1997 with FK Obilić. During his tenure in Belgrade he won the 1997-98 Yugoslav Championship, and featured in the 1998–99 UEFA Champions League. Following an early successful domestic career and a brief stint with FK Hajduk Kula he ventured abroad to play in the Chinese Jia-A League, and Bulgarian A PFG. He returned home in 2004 to spent time with Crvena Zvezda Pavliš, and FK ČSK Čelarevo.

In 2006, he went abroad for the third time to play in the Canadian Soccer League with the Serbian White Eagles FC. The acquisition of Viciknez played a prominent role in the procession of European professional players to the CSL, which ushered in an era of a large volume of import players to the league. Throughout his time in Toronto he served numerous times as the club's team captain, and won several accolades such as the CSL Championship, International Division title, and the CSL MVP award.

Playing career
Viciknez began his career in 1995 with FK Dinamo Pančevo in the Second League of FR Yugoslavia. In 1997, he signed with FK Obilić of the First League of FR Yugoslavia. In his debut season he was part of the famed Obilić squad that won the 1997–98 Yugoslav Championship. As a result, participated in the 1998–99 UEFA Champions League, where he played against FC Bayern Munich. In 2000, he went abroad to China to play with Shanghai Shenhua in the Chinese Jia-A League. While playing in China, he was sometimes mistakenly referred to as Sasa Racha (his name was confused with his teammate Saša Raca).

His stay in China was short-lived and he returned to Europe to briefly play with FK Hajduk Kula, before heading abroad once more to Bulgaria. During his time in Bulgaria he played with PFC Naftex Burgas in the Bulgarian A PFG. After two seasons abroad he returned to Serbia to play in the Serbian League Vojvodina, and the Serbian First League with Crvena Zvezda Pavliš, and FK ČSK Čelarevo.

In 2006, he went overseas to play with the Serbian White Eagles in the Canadian Soccer League. He made his debut on 19 May 2006 against Italia Shooters, where he also recorded a goal in a 3-2 victory. In his debut season he was named to the CSL All-Star roster against Clyde F.C., where he scored the lone goal in a 2-1 defeat. He finished as the club's second highest goal scorer, and clinched the International Division title. In the postseason he scored both goals in a 3-0 victory over Toronto Supra Portuguese to advance Serbia to the semi-finals. He featured in the CSL Championship final against Italia Shooters where Italia managed to upset Serbia with a 1-0 defeat. At the conclusion of the season he received the MVP award.

During the 2007 season he contributed to Serbia's second International Division title, and reached the championship final for the second straight season. He also was named to the all-star squad for the second year in a row. Viciknez added the championship to his resume in the 2008 season, where in the finals Serbia faced Trois-Rivières Attak and won the title after a 2-1 victory in a penalty shootout. The following season, Serbia added their third International Division title to their trophy cabinet. During the preliminary round of the postseason he contributed significantly by recording several goals in their series against TFC Academy. He featured in his fourth championship appearance in a rematch against Trois-Rivières, where the Attak denied Serbia their championship after a 3-2 defeat in a penalty shootout. The league recognized his efforts by awarding him with his second CSL MVP award.

Honours

Obilić
First League of FR Yugoslavia: 1997–98

Serbian White Eagles
CSL Championship: 2008
Canadian Soccer League International Division: 2006, 2007, 2009

References

External links

1974 births
Living people
People from Vršac
Expatriate footballers in Bulgaria
Expatriate footballers in China
Expatriate soccer players in Canada
Association football wingers
Serbian expatriate footballers
Serbian expatriate sportspeople in Bulgaria
Serbian expatriate sportspeople in Canada
Serbian footballers
Serbian White Eagles FC players
Neftochimic Burgas players
FK Dinamo Pančevo players
FK Obilić players
FK ČSK Čelarevo players
Serbian expatriate sportspeople in China
FK Hajduk Kula players
First Professional Football League (Bulgaria) players
Canadian Soccer League (1998–present) players
Shanghai Shenhua F.C. players
China League One players
First League of Serbia and Montenegro players
Serbian League players